The 2019-20 Union Dutchmen ice hockey season was the 80th season of play for the program and the 29th season in the ECAC Hockey conference. The Dutchmen represented Union College and played their home games at Achilles Center, and were coached by Rick Bennett, in his 9th season.

Departures

Recruiting

Roster
As of September 12, 2019.

|}

Standings

Schedule and Results

|-
!colspan=12 style=";" | Regular Season

|-
!colspan=12 style=";" | 

|-
!colspan=12 style=";" | 

|- align="center" bgcolor="#e0e0e0"
|colspan=12|Union Lost Series 1–2

Scoring statistics

Goaltending statistics

Rankings

References

Union Dutchmen ice hockey seasons
Union Dutchmen
Union Dutchmen
2019 in sports in New York (state)
2020 in sports in New York (state)